The barred honeyeater (Glycifohia undulatus) is a species of bird in the family Meliphagidae.
It is endemic to New Caledonia.

References

barred honeyeater
Endemic birds of New Caledonia
barred honeyeater
Taxonomy articles created by Polbot
Taxa named by Anders Sparrman
Taxobox binomials not recognized by IUCN